Dondria Nicole Fields (born January 6, 1987), better known by her stage name Dondria Nicole, is an American R&B singer, currently signed to So So Def Recordings. Before getting signed, Dondria was known to post YouTube videos singing cover songs.

Biography

Early life and career beginnings
Dondria was discovered on YouTube by So So Def founder Jermaine Dupri. She was born in Dover, Oklahoma, and raised in Sachse, Texas. Dondria began singing at a young age in her church choir after her friend David Baker asked her to join with him. In 2006 at the age of 19, she created a YouTube channel using the username "Phatfffat" to showcase her singing talent. With YouTube she built a sizable following online, and eventually she was contacted by Dupri via a YouTube Message. Although it took several messages before she responded, when she did she was flown to Atlanta to meet Dupri and he offered her a recording contract with So So Def Recordings and she agreed with Dupri and signed her in 2007. Originally she was asked to record a song with R&B group Jagged Edge, but eventually was offered a solo contract.

2008–10: Dondria Vs. Phatfffat

Dondria released a buzz single for her debut album, titled "Can't Stop" on June 17, 2008. It originally was known to be her first single, but was only used as promotion for the project. She also was featured on a song titled "Like This" by Bow Wow, which was included on his 2009 studio album New Jack City, II.
Dondria released a mixtape for fans, titled "Dondria Duets" on November 6, 2009. The Mixtape was available for download on Global14.com, for free. She recorded popular male R&B songs that included verses by herself, turning them into duets. The Mixtape was released to promote, Dondria's single You're The One which dropped a few weeks later.

Her debut album, titled Dondria Vs. Phatfffat, was released on August 17, 2010. It debuted at No. 43, with first week sales of 422, which is notable since she was discovered off YouTube. The official debut single for her album "You're The One" was released on November 23, 2009. The single debuted on Billboard Hot R&B/Hip-Hop Songs charts at No. 100 and peaked at No. 14. It's also charted at No. 21 on the Christian Songs chart the single has reached at No. 70 on the radio songs. It is now a No. 10 on Heetseekers Chart. The video has peaked at No. 1 on 106 & Park. Her second single was titled "Shawty Wus Up" which features label-mate Johnta Austin and Diamond. Dondria will be touring as the opening act on Trey Songz and Monica's "Passion Pain & Pleasure" Tour. The tour began on August 6, 2010, in Shreveport, Louisiana. On August 4, 2010, "Makin Love" from Dondria's debut album leaked to the Internet, getting overall good reviews from fans.
"Where Did We Go Wrong," a song from the album co-written by Dondria, was to be the album's third single. It was never officially released, but it did make the R&B charts.

2011–2016: Second studio album, Dondria Duets 2 and 3
On June 3, 2011, "Boiling Points" was confirmed by Dondria to be an upcoming single on her Tumblr Blog. The original song featuring Jermaine Dupri first appeared on her "Dondria Duets 2", Mixtape. It is unclear if the record will be released as a mixtape single, or the first offering from a brand new studio album. Currently, Dondria is in the studio recording songs for her upcoming second album. She also just dropped remixes of Miguel's "Quickie", Drake's "Headlines" and Maroon 5's "Make Moves Like Jagger". She has maintained a YouTube fan base of more than 120,000 subscribers.

Dondria originally planned to release a 3rd edition to her "Dondria Duets" mixtape series, entitled "Dondria Duets III: 90s Edition" on January 6, 2012, her 25th birthday; however, it was delayed. The mixtape was instead to be released on February 1, 2012. 
In a YouTube video of the making of the "Dondria Duets III: 90's Edition" mixtape, Jermaine Dupri revealed it would the final installment to the series, however Dondria would do an official duet album to be released as her third studio album. The album would include all new original duet recordings. "Dondria Duets III: 90s Edition" was released online via Global14.com on February 1, 2012.
Also confirmed on this date was information regarding he first official single from Dondria's second album. Rapup.com reported the single will be a track entitled "Ol School Love", and featuring Da Brat.

2017–present: Dondria Duets 4 &5, EP: The Day of the Don, EP: A Tale of Hearts 
On July 4, 2017, Dondria released her first original body of work since her debut album, "Dondria Vs. Phatfffat". The EP, entitled "The Day of The Don" embodied 6 songs covering ebbs and flows of a relationship. The EP was received well and showcased more of Dondria's writing ability. She co-wrote with ShaSha Jones, Derrick "D-Mac" Mckenzie, The Penhouse, Bryan-Michael Cox, Nikki, Songwriter Pendrick, and Yonni.

On February 14, 2018, Dondria dropped an unannounced  "Dondria Duets 4" Mixtape as a token of appreciation to her fans for Valentine's Day. The mixtape feat remixes of hits like Chris Brown's "To My Bed, Dvsn's "Too Deep", and Bruno Mars' "That's What I Like". It had been 6 years since the last installment of the Dondria Duet series so her fans were definitely in for a treat.

Dondria later dropped another EP on November 9, 2018, called "A Tale of Hearts". This was a complete duet project with childhood friend and Youtube partner in crime, Corey "Broadway" Stevenson. The EP was produced by Patrick Carpenter of First Kontact Music Group and pleased all of the duo's fans that had been watching them for years and we were wondering what happened to their bond.

On January 15, 2021, Dondria released her single "Let It Be," produced by Bryan-Michael Cox. She co-wrote the song with John Bias.

Discography

Studio albums

Mixtapes 
 Dondria Duets (2009)
 Dondria Duets 2 (2011)
 Dondria Duets 3: 90s Edition (2012)
 Dondria Duets 4 (2018)
 Dondria Duets 5: The 90's Edition II (2019)

Singles

Guest appearances

Tours

As supporting act
 2010: Trey Songz and Monica (Passion Pain & Pleasure Tour)

References

1.http://www.global14.com/dondria/

External links

Dondria at Last.fm

1987 births
Living people
People from Kingfisher County, Oklahoma
People from Dallas County, Texas
American contemporary R&B singers
20th-century African-American women singers
Singers from Texas
So So Def Recordings artists
Singers from Oklahoma
21st-century American women singers
21st-century American singers
21st-century African-American women singers